Chahar Taq Bon (also Romanized as Chahār Ţāq Bon) is a village in Siyahrud Rural District, in the Central District of Juybar County, Mazandaran Province, Iran. At the 2006 census, its population was 452, in 116 families.

References 

Populated places in Juybar County